Aspro is a contract bridge bidding convention devised by Terence Reese as a British variant on the Astro convention to intervene over a 1NT opening bid.

Like Astro, Aspro is initiated by a 2-level overcall in a minor suit when the overcaller or intervenor holds an unbalanced hand with at least nine cards in two suits (i.e. 5 in one and 4 in the other), at least one of which is a major.   
2 shows hearts and another suit, and
2 shows spades and a minor suit.

Subsequent bidding
The foregoing includes the possibility that the 2 overcaller holds both majors.  Using Aspro with five spades and four or five hearts, the 2 bid is followed by 2 over partner's 2 or 2; with four spades and five hearts, one rebids 2 over partner's 2.

See also
List of defenses to 1NT

References

Bridge conventions